The British Armoured Car Expeditionary Force (ACEF) was a British military unit sent to Russia during the First World War. It fought alongside the Russian Empire on the Eastern Front between June 1916 and 1918. The unit consisted of 566 men.

History 
By the end of 1915, trench warfare on the Western Front meant that there was no scope for armoured cars to be stationed there. Three squadrons of armoured cars built by the Royal Naval Air Service were supposed to be sent by ship to Archangel in Russia to fight on the Eastern Front alongside Russia. However, sea ice prevented them from reaching Archangel, so the unit ended up at Alexandrovsk instead. The ACEF fought alongside the Imperial Russian Army in Galicia, Romania and the Caucasus Mountains until the Bolshevik coup of 1917, when the ACEF was withdrawn from Russia.

Notable personnel 
 Oliver Locker-Lampson - commander of the unit
 Walter Smiles

References 

Military operations of World War I